Serbian folklore is the folk traditions among ethnic Serbs. The earliest examples of Serbian folklore are seen in the pre-Christian Slavic customs transformed into Christianity.

Roots and characteristics

Folklore

The Apostles of the Slavs, Cyril and Methodius, have been venerated by Serbian Orthodox Christians since their Christianization in 867, they have been considered Serbs by historians.

In Krajište and Vlasina there are epic stories of the extermination of Roman males in a battle, and of the settling of Russians (Antes)

Serbian Epic poetry

Serbian epic poetry is a form of epic poetry written by Serbs originating in today's Serbia, Bosnia and Herzegovina and Montenegro. The main cycles were composed by unknown Serb authors between the 14th and 19th centuries. They are largely concerned with historical events and personages.

The corpus of Serbian epic poetry is divided into cycles:
Non-historic cycle
Pre-Kosovo cycle - poems about events that predate the Battle of Kosovo - songs about royal family-Nemanjići and folk songs
Cycle of Kraljević Marko
Kosovo cycle - poems about events that happened just before and after the Battle of Kosovo (no poem covers the battle itself)
Post-Kosovo cycle - poems about post-Battle events 
Poems about the liberation of Serbia
Poems about the liberation of Montenegro

See also
Serbian folk music
Serbian dances
Serbian culture

References

External links
Serbian folk dance group 
Serbian folk dance in Canada - SCA Opleanc
 "Christian Serbia maintains its faith in folklore", BBC Radio, February 4, 2010